This article lists orbital and suborbital launches planned for the second half of the year 2023, including launches planned for 2023 without a specific launch date.

For all other spaceflight activities, see 2023 in spaceflight. For launches in the first half of 2023, see List of spaceflight launches in January–June 2023.



Orbital launches 

|colspan=8 style="background:white;"|

July 
|-

|colspan=8 style="background:white;"|

August 
|-

|colspan=8 style="background:white;"|

September 
|-

|colspan=8 style="background:white;"|

October 
|-

|colspan=8 style="background:white;"|

November 
|-

|colspan=8 style="background:white;"|

December 
|-

|colspan=8 style="background:white;"|

To be determined 
|-

|}

Suborbital flights 

|}

Notes

References

External links 

2023 in spaceflight
Spaceflight by year
Spaceflight